Dorton is a village in England.

Dorton may also refer to:
Dorton, Kentucky, an unincorporated community in southern Pike County
Dorton Arena, in Raleigh, North Carolina
Dorton House, a historic house in Seal, Kent
Dorton Spa, in Buckinghamshire, England
Randy Dorton
Richard Dorton